Chishma is the name of several rural localities in Russia:
Chishma, Aktanyshsky District, Republic of Tatarstan, a rural locality (a selo) in Aktanyshsky District of the Republic of Tatarstan
Chishma, Nurlatsky District, Republic of Tatarstan, a rural locality (a settlement) in Nurlatsky District of the Republic of Tatarstan
Chishma, name of several other rural localities